Stelios Maistrellis (born 10 November 1979) is a former Greek footballer who played as a defender.

Club career
Maistrellis played for Akratitos in the Greek Super League during the 2003–04 season.

References

1979 births
Living people
Greek footballers
Association football defenders
AEK Athens F.C. players
A.P.O. Akratitos Ano Liosia players
Aiolikos F.C. players
Panachaiki F.C. players
Ethnikos Asteras F.C. players
People from Mytilene
Sportspeople from the North Aegean